The Z-100 computer is a personal computer made by Zenith Data Systems (ZDS). It was a competitor to the IBM PC.

Design 
The Zenith Data Systems Z-100 is a pre-assembled version of the Heathkit H100 electronic kit. In the same family, the Z-120 is an all-in-one model with self-contained monitor, and the Z-110 (called the low profile model) is similar in size to the cabinet of an IBM PC. Both models have a built-in keyboard that was modeled after the IBM Selectric typewriter.

 Dual processors: 8085 and 8088.
 Available with CP/M and Z-DOS (non-IBM compatible MS-DOS variant).
 Five S-100 expansion slots.
 Two 320 KB 40-track double-sided 5.25-inch floppy disk drives. Socket enabled direct plug-in of external 8-inch floppies.
 2× serial ports (2661 UART), one Centronics printer port (discrete TTL chips), light pen port.
 640×225 bitmap display. 8 colors (low-profile model), or monochrome upgradable to 8 greyscales (all-in-one).
 Base 128 KB RAM, expandable to 192 KB on board, to 768 KB with S-100 cards. (Video RAM was paged into the 64 KB block above 768 KB).

The Z-100 is partially compatible with the IBM PC, using standard floppy drives. It runs a non-IBM version of MS-DOS, so generic MS-DOS programs run, but most commercial PC software use IBM BIOS extensions and do not run, including Lotus 1-2-3. Several companies offered software or hardware solutions to permit unmodified PC programs to work on the Z-100.

The Z-100 has unusually good graphics for its era, superior to the contemporary CGA (640×200 monochrome bitmap or 320×200 4-color), IBM Monochrome Display Adapter (MDA) (80×25 monochrome text-only), and with 8 colors or grayscales available at a lower resolution than the Hercules Graphics Card (720×348 monochrome). Early versions of AutoCAD were released for the Z-100 because of these advanced graphics.

Aftermarket vendors also released modifications to upgrade mainboard memory and permit installation of an Intel 8087 math coprocessor.

Uses 
In 1983, Clarkson College of Technology (now Clarkson University) became the first college in the nation to give each incoming freshman a personal computer. The model issued to them was the Z-100.

In 1986, the US Air Force awarded Zenith Data Systems a $242 million contract for 90,000 Z-100 desktop computers.

Reception 
Jerry Pournelle in 1983 praised the Z-100's keyboard, and wrote that it "had the best color graphics I've seen on a small machine". Although forced to buy a real IBM PC because of the Z-100 and other computers' incomplete PC compatibility, he reported in December 1983 that a friend who was inexperienced with electronic kits was able to assemble a H100 in a day, with only the disk controller needing soldering. Ken Skier praised the computer's reliability in the magazine in January 1984 after using the computer for more than 40 hours a week for eight months. While criticizing its inability to read other disk formats, he approved of Zenith's technical support, documentation, and keyboard and graphics. Skier concluded that those who "want a well-designed, well-built, well-documented system that runs the best of 8-bit and 16-bit worlds" should "consider the Zenith Z-100".

References

External links 
 Z-100 information and pictures from the DigiBarn Computer Museum
 Heathkit / Zenith Z100/110/120 at old-computers.com
 Z-100 Software and Manual archive from Antediluvian Designs

Z80-based home computers
8086-based home computers
Zenith Data Systems